Znamierowski (feminine: Znamierowska) is a Polish surname. Notable people with the surname include:

Alfred Znamierowski (1940–2019), Polish vexillologist, heraldist and journalist
Czeslaw Znamierowski (1890–1977), Soviet Lithuanian painter
Czesław Znamierowski (1888–1967), Polish philosopher, jurist and sociologist
Nell Znamierowski (born 1931), American textile artist
 (1898–1990), Polish ethnographer

Polish-language surnames